Kwiatoniów  is a village located in the Opole Voivodeship (southern Poland), near the border with the Czech Republic. It is in Głubczyce County and Gmina Głubczyce.

References

Villages in Głubczyce County